Son of Spirit was the second album that Spirit released through Mercury Records, and their seventh album overall. It was released in October 1975. Unlike Spirit of '76, however, it did not make the national charts.

Though some of the album's tracks were from the same sessions that produced Spirit of '76, it also features several Randy California solo demos that have been augmented by a rhythm machine.

It was originally reissued on CD in the early 1990s, and it was remastered and reissued (on a CD that also included Farther Along) in 2004 by Beat Goes On.

Track listing 
All songs written by Randy California except noted.

Personnel

Spirit 
Randy California - bass, guitar, vocals
Ed Cassidy - percussion, drums
Barry Keene - bass

Production 
Gary Brandt - engineer
Barry Keene - engineer
Steve Mantoani - engineer
Blair Mooney - engineer
Keith Olsen - engineer

References 

Spirit (band) albums
1975 albums
Mercury Records albums